Earth chestnut is a common name for several plants and may refer to:

Bunium bulbocastanum
Conopodium majus